Sandra Rosenthal may refer to:
Sandra B. Rosenthal (born 1936), American philosopher 
Sandra J. Rosenthal (born 1966), professor of chemistry